Cindy Griffin (July 11, 1969) is an American college basketball coach, currently women's head coach at her alma mater, Saint Joseph's University.

Career
She was previously head coach at Loyola University in Maryland and was also an assistant at Vanderbilt.

Head coaching record

References

External links
Coaching bio

1969 births
Living people
American women's basketball coaches
Basketball coaches from Pennsylvania
Basketball players from Pennsylvania
Loyola Greyhounds women's basketball coaches
Point guards
Saint Joseph's Hawks women's basketball coaches
Saint Joseph's Hawks women's basketball players
Vanderbilt Commodores women's basketball coaches